Douglass is a lunar impact crater on the far side of the Moon. It lies to the southwest of the crater Frost and south-southwest of the large walled plain Landau.

The western rim has been shaped by several interior impacts, most notably the remnant of a crater that cuts an outward notch in the northwestern rim. The southeastern rim of this interior crater is now little more than a low rise across the floor of Douglass. Another impact along the southern side has produced a smaller outward bulge and a portion of the rim forms a ridge protruding into the interior floor. Smaller craters lie along the northeastern rim. The remainder of the rim is worn and rounded, and the interior floor is otherwise level and featureless.

Satellite craters 

By convention these features are identified on lunar maps by placing the letter on the side of the crater midpoint that is closest to Douglass.

References 

 
 
 
 
 
 
 
 
 
 
 
 

Impact craters on the Moon